Adiantoides is an extinct genus of herbivorous mammal, belonging to the order Litopterna. It lived during the Middle to Late Eocene, in South America.

Description

It was a small-sized animal, only slightly larger than a cat. 

The skull was rather primitive, evocating some of the Paleocene and Eocene so-called "Condylarths". The orbit was large and in a median position, the muzzle not particularly elongated and the neurocranium was rather small. The frontal bone had a small postorbital apophysis, and there was no regression of the nasal bones, contrary to what happened in other litopterns such as Cramauchenia. There was an enigmatic element near the basisphenoid, suggesting a special structure in the auditory region. The mandibular symphysis was robust. The dentition was complete and brachydont, the first two upper incisors were small, while the third was well developed, and the canine was slightly larger than the third incisor. The premolars progressively grew in size from the first to the fourth, and there was a strong fold in the parastyle.

Classification

Adiantoides was first described in 1949, based on fossils including a nearly complete skull and a mandible from the Mendoza Province of Argentina. The type species is Adiantoides leali, from the Late Eocene. Subsequently, in 1983, Adiantoides magnus was described, based on a mandible from the Middle Eocene locality Cañadón Vaca in the Sarmiento Formation, in the Chubut Province of Argentina. 

Adiantoides is the best known genus of the Adianthidae, a group of small sized litopterns with characteristic teeth. In particular, Adiantoides may be related to the basal Indalecia, and both genera are place within the subfamily Indaleciinae. However, many more recent studies have considered Indaleciidae a separate family.

Bibliography

G. G. Simpson and J. L. Minoprio. 1949. A new adianthine litoptern and associated mammals from a Deseadan faunule in Mendoza, Argentina. American Museum Novitates 1434:1-27
R. L. Cifelli and M. F. Soria. 1983. Systematics of the Adianthidae (Litopterna, Mammalia). American Museum Novitates 2771:1-25

Litopterns
Eocene mammals of South America
Paleogene Argentina
Fossils of Argentina
Fossil taxa described in 1949
Taxa named by George Gaylord Simpson
Prehistoric placental genera
Golfo San Jorge Basin
Sarmiento Formation